Gondia Assembly constituency is one of the 288 Vidhan Sabha (legislative assembly) constituencies of Maharashtra state, western India. This constituency is located in Gondia district. The delimitation of the constituency happened in 2008.

Geographical scope
Parts of Gondia taluka viz. revenue circles Kamtha, Ravanwadi,
Dasgaon Budruk, Gondia and Gondia Municipal Council.

Representatives
2019: Vinod Agrawal represents the Gondia Assembly Constituency. He belongs to the Independent
.

References

Assembly constituencies of Maharashtra